CFNI is a Canadian radio station that broadcasts a classic hits format at 1240 AM in Port Hardy, British Columbia. The station is owned by Vista Broadcast Group.

The station began broadcasting in 1979.

Rebroadcasters
CFPA-FM 100.3 Port Alice

References

External links
1240 Coast AM
 
 
 

FNI
FNI
FNI
Radio stations established in 1979
1979 establishments in British Columbia